Frederic Desire Ehui , best known as Meiway (born 17 March 1962 in Grand Bassam), is a singer from the Ivory Coast. He is most notable for pioneering the Zoblazo style. His hits include "200% Zoblazo", "Godeba", "Appolo 95", "Miss Lolo", and "DJ Tassouman".

Discography
Studio albums
 Meiway (Ayibebou) (1989)
 200% Zoblazo (1991)
 Jamais 203 (300% Zoblazo) (1993)
 Appolo 95 (1995)
 Les genies vous parlent (1997)
 Hold Up (Zo Gang feat. Meiway) (1998)
 Extraterrestre (1999)
 Le procés (Zo Gang International) (2000)
 Eternel (2001)
 Golgotha (2004)
 9ème commandement (2006)
 M20 (Meiway 20 ans) (2009)
 Profeseur (2012)
 Illimitic (2016)
 Légende (2019)

Compilation albums
 Best Of (1997)
 Le meilleur de (2003)

References

1962 births
Living people
21st-century Ivorian male singers
People from Grand-Bassam
Ivorian singer-songwriters
20th-century Ivorian male singers